Confessional is a British espionage thriller television miniseries starring Robert Lindsay, Keith Carradine, Simon Chandler, Robert Lang, Valentina Yakunina and Arthur Brauss. This series based on the 1985 spy novel of the same name by Jack Higgins and adapted for the television by James Mitchell and directed by Gordon Flemyng, it was produced by Granada Television for the ITV network and originally aired in four parts from 4 to 25 October 1989. The plot follows a rogue terrorist turned Soviet assassin, code named Cuchulain, trying to prevent a peace agreement between the parties involved in Northern Ireland.

Cast
Robert Lindsay as Thomas Kelly
Keith Carradine as Liam Devlin
Simon Chandler as Fox
Robert Lang as Brigadier Charles Ferguson 
Valentina Yakunina as Tanya Maslovskaya
Arthur Brauss as General Maslovsky
David de Keyser as Professor Cherny
Stephen Holland as Davey
Helen Rappaport as Major Belova
Niall Toibin as Sean Gallagher
Hugo Conlon as Irish newsreader
Colum Convey as Billy
Tony Hawkins as English newsreader
Peter Majer as Levin
Michael John Paliotti as Father Michael Kelly
Anthony Quayle as The Pope
Catherine Rabett as Jane Barclay

Episodes

References

External links

1989 British television series debuts
1989 British television series endings
1980s British drama television series
ITV television dramas
1980s British television miniseries
British thriller television series
Television shows based on British novels
Television series by ITV Studios
Television shows produced by Granada Television
English-language television shows
Espionage television series
Television shows set in England
Television shows set in the Republic of Ireland